Franklin Square is one of the 22 squares of Savannah, Georgia, United States. It is located in the northernmost row of the city's five rows of squares, at Montgomery Street and West St. Julian Street. It is west of Ellis Square in the northwestern corner of the city's grid of squares. The square now anchors the western end of the City Market retail area.

The oldest building on the square is 317 West Bryan Street, the Abram Minis Building, which dates to 1846.

The square is named for Benjamin Franklin, one of the Founding Fathers of the United States.

It once contained a forty-foot-tall water tower to distribute water to residents. It was built with after the previous system of public and private surface wells was overwhelmed by the rising population of the city. The water was taken out of the Savannah River west of the Ogelthorpe Canal Basin before being filtered and pumped up to the water tower. Because of the tower, Franklin Square was also known as Water Tank Square, Water Tower Square and Reservoir Square.

The square was destroyed in 1935 with the routing of U.S. Highway 17 on Montgomery Street but was restored in the mid-1980s. In 1967, Montgomery Street was changed from two-way to one-way between Jones and Bay streets; in 1985, however, to assist with the restoration of Franklin Square, it was restored to two-way traffic between Bay and Broughton streets. In 2019, the bi-directional traffic flow was extended from Broughton to Liberty streets.

Dedication

Markers and structures

Constituent buildings

Each building below is in one of the eight blocks around the square composed of four residential "tything" blocks and four civic ("trust") blocks, now known as the Oglethorpe Plan. They are listed with construction years where known.

Northwestern residential/tything block
418 West Bryan Street (1910)
420 West Bryan Street (1912)
14 Martin Luther King Jr. Boulevard (1891/1924)

Northwestern trust/civic block
First African Baptist Church, 23 Montgomery Street (1859)

Southwestern residential/tything block
Augustus Walter Building, 401–405 West Congress Street (1867/1870)
407–415 West Congress Street (1870/1872)
James Brannen Building, 419–423 West Congress Street (1875) – third story added 1906; roof development is 21st century

Northeastern trust/civic block
Abram Minis Building, 317 West Bryan Street (20–22 Montgomery Street) (1846) – oldest building on the square; Vinnie Van GoGo's as of 2021
301–305 West St. Julian Street (1855)
302 West St. Julian Street (1855) – A. T. Hun Art Gallery as of 2021
304 West St. Julian Street (c. 1855)
310 West St. Julian Street (1884)
312 West St. Julian Street (1860)
314–316 West St. Julian Street (1870)

Southeastern trust/civic block
Charles Lamar Properties, 305–307 West St. Julian Street (1892)
309–315 West St. Julian Street (1902)

Southeastern residential/tything block
George Hardcastle Building, 30–38 Montgomery Street (1855)
Charles Meitzler Building, 307–309 West Congress Street (1875)
Germania Fire Company, 315 West Congress Street (1871)

Gallery

References

Franklin Square (Savannah, Georgia)
1790 establishments in Georgia (U.S. state)